"One Drop" is a 1979 Bob Marley song from the album Survival (1979) notable for exemplifying the one drop rhythm, one of the three main reggae drum rhythms, as performed by The Wailers' drummer Carlton Barrett.
The song uses Marley's most militantly Rastafarian lyrics. "In 'One Drop,' Marley asserts that he does not want 'devil philosophy', he wants the 'teachings of His Majesty.' In this sense Rastafari was not merely a religious faith, for Marley it was a political and philosophical worldview." The song was re-released on the compilation album Gold (2005).

The one-drop rule is a social and legal principle of racial classification that was historically prominent in the United States in the 20th century. It asserted that any person with even one ancestor of black ancestry is considered to be black.

The name One Drop is also used by the Marley Beverage Company, partly associated with the family of Bob Marley, as the brand name for Marley "premium Jamaican coffee beverage made with real cane sugar and all-natural ingredients".

References

1979 songs
Bob Marley songs
Songs written by Bob Marley